Firestorm Tactical Card Game is an out-of-print collectible card game by Third World Games.

Description
The original set was called Prime and had 284 cards. The game was considered difficult to learn according to the Scrye Collectible Card Game Checklist & Price Guide as the rulebook contained 92 pages.

Publication history
It was first released in June 2001. An expansion called Enemy of My Enemy was planned for November 2001 but never materialized. It would have introduced two new factions: the Corsairs of Nephalis and the Tristan Corporation.

Further reading
Strategy in Scrye #52

References

Card games introduced in 2001
Collectible card games